Richard Overton (born August 10, 1954) is an American screenwriter, actor and comedian. His writing credits include Dennis Miller Live, and his acting credits include Beverly Hills Cop, Million Dollar Mystery, Groundhog Day and Mrs. Doubtfire.

Life and career
Overton was born in Forest Hills, Queens, New York, the son of Nancy Overton (née Swain), a singer, and Hall Overton, a teacher and music arranger. He grew up in Englewood, New Jersey, where he attended Dwight Morrow High School.

Overton made his first onscreen appearance in the 1982 film Young Doctors in Love, followed by a small role in Airplane II: The Sequel later that year. In 1987, he wrote an episode of The New Adventures of Beans Baxter while also appearing in various films and television shows including Willow, Amazing Stories and Million Dollar Mystery.

In 1992, he landed a role in the FOX Network sketch comedy show The Edge. The show ended in 1993. Later that year, Overton appeared in two episodes of Seinfeld and landed a small role in Mrs. Doubtfire. The following year, he won an Emmy for writing an episode of Dennis Miller Live.

In 2005, Overton appeared on Alias and Joan Of Arcadia; in the latter he played God explaining to the title character the meaning of real wealth. He also portrayed both H.G. Wells and Orson Welles in a podcast episode of The Radio Adventures of Dr. Floyd that same year.

In 2009, Overton appeared in the film A Fork in the Road alongside Jaime King.

Overton appeared in a General Electric commercial as the father who wants his son to have his grandfather's hammer.

Filmography

Target...Earth? (1980, Documentary) - Himself
Young Doctors in Love (1982) - Dr. Thurman Flicker
Airplane II: The Sequel (1982) - Clerk
Beverly Hills Cop (1984) - Bonded Warehouse Night Supervisor
Odd Jobs (1986) - Roy
Gung Ho (1986) - Googie
A Fine Mess (1986) - Companion
Modern Girls (1986) - Marsalis
Million Dollar Mystery (1987) - Stuart Briggs
Willow (1988) - Franjean
Traxx (1988) - Frank Williams
Earth Girls Are Easy (1988) - Dr. Rick
That's Adequate (1989) - Stand-up Comic
A Sinful Life (1989) - Janitor
Blind Fury (1989) - Tector Pike
The Rocketeer (1991) - South Seas Patron
Galaxies Are Colliding (1992) - Rex
Groundhog Day (1993) - Ralph
Mrs. Doubtfire (1993) - Maitre D'
The High Crusade (1994) - Sir Roger
Devil in the Flesh (1998) - Dr. Milletson
My Giant (1998) - Director
EDtv (1999) - Barry
Jackpot (2001) - Roland
Extreme Honor (2001) - Dr. Lumber
Shoot or Be Shot (2002) - Sasha
Eight Legged Freaks (2002) - Deputy Pete Willis
Northfork (2003) - Rudolph
Motocross Kids (2004) - Hook
Serial Killing 4 Dummys (2004) - Mr. Korn
Off the Lip (2004) - McReady
Taxi (2004) - Man at Taxi Convention
Fat Albert (2004) - Coach Gillespie
Frostbite (2005) - Bartender
A Lot Like Love (2005) - Tailor
Keep Your Distance (2005) - Dr. Floyd Beasley
Popstar (2005) - Mr. Thomas
Fun with Dick and Jane (2005) - Head Shop Clerk
Blue Sombrero (2005) - General Hard / Fabio / Major Cajones
Cloud 9 (2006) - Buckner
Billy Schulz (2006) - Billy Schulz
The Last Stand (2006) - Redneck Heckler
Comedy Hell (2006) - Wayne
The Tripper (2006) - Mayor Hal Burton
The Astronaut Farmer (2006) - Arnold 'Arnie' Millard
National Lampoon's Pledge This! (2006) - Janitor Jones
Chasing Robert (2007) - Thadeus Wrazinski
The Metrosexual (2007) - Meter Maid
A Plumm Summer (2007) - Agent Brinkman
Totally Baked (2007) - Himself - Street Interview
Cloverfield (2008) - Frantic Man
So Long Jimmy (2008) - Dimitri Adams
The Whole Truth (2009) - Uri Standinoff
Year One (2009) - Sodom Officer Rick (uncredited)
The Informant! (2009) - Terry Wilson
A Fork in the Road (in post-production, 2010) - Sheriff Thompson
Jelly (Post-Production, 2010) - Tad Wasserstein
Dinner for Schmucks (2010) - Chuck - Beard Champion
InSight (2011) - Det. Gehrke
Bad Teacher (2011) - Philip
Frogtown (2011) - Steve
The Babymakers (2012) - Officer Raspler
Noobz (2012) - Martin Wilson
A Haunted House 2 (2014) - Professor Wilde
Such Good People (2014) - Sidney Talmadge
Muffin Top: A Love Story (2014) - Steve
Lethal Seduction (2015) - Deacon Williams
Body High (2015) - Abe
30 Years of Dark Seduction (2015) - Himself
Dave Made a Maze (2017) - Hobo
Literally, Right Before Aaron (2017) - Dean
A Futile and Stupid Gesture (2018) - First Publisher
Duck Duck Goose (2018) - Stanley (voice)

Television

Remington Steele (1 episode, 1983) - New Wave Cop
Help Wanted: Kids (1986) - Photographer
Double Switch (1987) - DeeJay
Amazing Stories (1 episode, 1987) - John Aubrey
Jonathan Winters: On the Ledge (1987, TV Movie) - Additional Improviser
Encyclopedia Brown (1 episode, 1989) - Buddy Claggett
Babes (10 episodes, 1990) - Ronnie Underwood
Bill and Ted's Excellent Adventures (1991) - Rufus
The Edge (7 episodes, 1992–1993)
Seinfeld (2 episodes, 1993) - The Drake
Attack of the 5 Ft. 2 Women (1994, TV Movie) - Officer Brown
Lois & Clark: The New Adventures of Superman (2 episodes, 1994–1995) - Victor
Duckman (1 episode, 1995) - (voice)
Encino Woman (1996, TV Movie) - Raji 
The Single Guy (2 episodes, 1996) - Carl Gannon / Gannon
Married... with Children (2 episodes, 1996) - Dr. Fisher
Ned and Stacey (1 episode, 1997) - Rod
ER (1 episode, 1997) - Mr. McNamara
The Weird Al Show (1 episode, 1997) - Mr. Molasses
Mad About You (2 episodes, 1998) - Earl / Shepherd
Honey, I Shrunk the Kids: The TV Show (1 episode, 1998) - George
It's Like, You Know... (2 episodes, 1999–2001) - Evan / Milosevic
The Secret Adventures of Jules Verne (5 episodes, 2000) - Count Gregory
Charmed (3 episodes, 2000) - Triad Member #3
JAG (1 episode, 2001) - William Markey
Curb Your Enthusiasm (1 episode, 2001) - Angry Gentile
Comic Remix (1 episode, 2002)
My Guide to Becoming a Rock Star (11 episodes, 2002) - Dole Greyson
NYPD Blue (1 episode, 2002) - Richard Webb
According to Jim (1 episode, 2004) - Rick
Six Feet Under (1 episode, 2004) - Thomas Sheedy
Joan of Arcadia (1 episode, 2004) - Bad Stand-Up Comedian God
Alias (1 episode, 2005) - Alexei Vasilevich
Family Plan (2005, TV Movie) - Owens
Lost (1 episode, 2005) - Matthew Reed
Van Stone: Tour of Duty (2006, TV Movie) - Gary Seibert's Dad
Rodney (1 episode, 2006) - Max
Drive (1 episode, 2007) - Bank Manager
Leverage (3 episodes, 2008–2009) - Taggert / FBI Agent Taggert
The Office (2 episodes, 2009) - William Beesly
 The George Lucas Talk Show (1 episode, 2020) - Self

Video game
The Incredible Hulk: Ultimate Destruction (2005)

Writer
An Evening at the Improv (1 episode, 1983)
The New Adventures of Beans Baxter (1 episode, 1987)
Dennis Miller Live (Unknown episodes, 1994)

Awards and nominations
Emmy Awards
Nominated: Outstanding Writing for a Variety or Music Program, Dennis Miller Live (1997)
Won: Outstanding Individual Achievement in Writing for a Variety or Music Program, Dennis Miller Live (1996)

Writers Guild of America Award
Nominated: Comedy/Variety (Including Talk) - Series, Dennis Miller Live (1997)

References

External links
www.realrickoverton.com

Rick Overton on MySpace
Rick Overton interviewed about growing up with a jazz legend father

1954 births
Living people
American male film actors
American male television actors
American male screenwriters
American male comedians
Dwight Morrow High School alumni
Emmy Award winners
Male actors from New Jersey
Male actors from New York City
People from Forest Hills, Queens
People from Englewood, New Jersey
20th-century American male actors
Comedians from New York City
20th-century American comedians
21st-century American comedians
Screenwriters from New York (state)
Screenwriters from New Jersey